Invented here or Not Invented There (NIT), an opposite of "not invented here", is a type of argument or attitude that occurs when management of an organisation is uncomfortable with innovation or development conducted in-house. Reasons this might be the case are varied, and range from a lack of confidence in the staff within the organisation to a desire to have a third party to blame in the event that a project fails. One effect of this version of "invented here" may be that detailed knowledge of the innovation or development never passes to permanent employees, possibly resulting in recurring additional expenditure and a less goodwill and bankable experience by employees.

One quotation that sums up the "invented here" attitude is "Gee, it can't be worth much if someone local thought of it first."

See also 
 Not invented here – opposite
Commercial off-the-shelf

References

Organizational culture
Appeals to emotion

zh:非我所創#是我所創